Ezra Perry Lincoln (November 17, 1868 – May 7, 1951) was a pitcher in Major League Baseball who played for the Cleveland Spiders and Syracuse Stars during the 1890 season. He continued to play in the minors through 1899, in the New England League.

External links

Cleveland Spiders players
Syracuse Stars (AA) players
19th-century baseball players
Major League Baseball pitchers
Baseball players from Massachusetts
1868 births
1951 deaths
Brockton Shoemakers players
Fall River Indians players
Minneapolis Minnies players
New Bedford Whalers (baseball) players
New Bedford Browns players
Pawtucket Phenoms players
Taunton Herrings players
People from Raynham, Massachusetts